Tengström is a Finnish family of priests. The first Tengström moved from Sweden to Finland after the Greater Wrath.

Notable members 
 Jakob Tengström (1755–1832), the first Archbishop of Turku
 Carl Fredrik Tengström, accountant of the Senate of Finland, nephew of Jakob Tengström
 Fredrika Charlotta Runeberg (Tengström, 1807 – 1879), author, wife of Johan Ludvig Runeberg
 Johan Jakob Tengström (1787–1858), scientist and author, nephew of Jakob Tengström
 Johan Robert Tengström (1823–46), philosopher, son of J. J.
 Erik Tengström (1913–1996), Swedish astronomer and geodesist
 G. Tengström, member of the January Commission in 1861
 Oscar Tengström, actor, founder of the Lilla Teatern

See also 

Swedish-speaking Finns

References 

Finnish families
Finnish families of Swedish ancestry